Hayden High School is a high school in Hayden, Arizona. It is part of the Hayden-Winkelman Unified School District; it was founded in 1936 to serve the mining community.

References

Educational institutions established in 1936
Public high schools in Arizona
Schools in Gila County, Arizona
1936 establishments in Arizona